Second Lieutenant Elaine A. Roe was an officer in the United States Army during World War II. She was awarded the Silver Star for her actions during Operation Shingle.

Action
Roe and her fellow nurses serving at the time - Mary Roberts, Rita Rourke, and Ellen Ainsworth - were the first women to be given the award.

Her award citation reads:

The President of the United States of America, authorized by Act of Congress July 9, 1918, takes pleasure in presenting the Silver Star to Second Lieutenant Elaine A. Roe, United States Army Nurse Corps, for gallantry in action on 10 February 1944, near Anzio, Italy. During a concentrated shelling of the 33d Field Hospital by heavy caliber enemy artillery the entire hospital area was sprayed with shell fragments which killed two nurses and wounded other military personnel. Electric wires were cut and lights extinguished. Working with flashlights, Lieutenant Elaine Roe and Lieutenant Rita Rourke immediately began the orderly evacuation of forty-two patients while quieting others who had become alarmed and were attempting to leave their beds. Throughout the shelling, which included enemy air bursts, they exhibited remarkable coolness and courage and carried on with complete disregard for their own safety. The quick thinking, competence under unnerving conditions and the loyal consideration of Lieutenant Roe and Lieutenant Rourke for the welfare of their patients, prevented confusion which might have been critical, and were an inspiration to the enlisted men working under their supervision. Their actions reflected the finest traditions of the United States Army and the Army Nurse Corps.

Her home of record was Whitewater, Wisconsin.

References

People from Whitewater, Wisconsin
Military personnel from Wisconsin
United States Army Nurse Corps officers
Recipients of the Silver Star
United States Army officers
Female United States Army nurses in World War II